Randall Lee Heisler (born August 7, 1961, in Warsaw, Indiana) is an American former discus thrower who competed in the 1988 Summer Olympics in Seoul, South Korea. He was head coach at Indiana University for several years before stepping down.  Soon after, he became the head track coach at Ball State University, where he coached until 2015.

Achievements

References

 Indiana profile
 

1961 births
Living people
American male discus throwers
Ball State Cardinals track and field coaches
Indiana Hoosiers track and field coaches
Indianapolis Greyhounds men's track and field athletes
Athletes (track and field) at the 1988 Summer Olympics
Olympic track and field athletes of the United States
Athletes (track and field) at the 1987 Pan American Games
Athletes (track and field) at the 1995 Pan American Games
People from Warsaw, Indiana
Pan American Games medalists in athletics (track and field)
Pan American Games bronze medalists for the United States
Universiade medalists in athletics (track and field)
Universiade gold medalists for the United States
Medalists at the 1987 Summer Universiade
Medalists at the 1987 Pan American Games
Medalists at the 1995 Pan American Games

Track and field athletes from Indiana